The 2015 Florida A&M Rattlers baseball team represents Florida A&M University in the sport of baseball during the 2015 college baseball season.  The Rattlers compete in Division I of the National Collegiate Athletic Association (NCAA) and the Southern Division of the Mid-Eastern Athletic Conference (MEAC). The team is coached by Jamey Shouppe, who will enter his Second season at Florida A&M. The Rattlers will be looking to build upon their appearance in the 2014 MEAC baseball tournament, where they made it to the semi-finals before being eliminated by Norfolk State.

Roster

Schedule

References

Florida AandM
Florida A&M Rattlers baseball seasons
Florida AandM